Francisco Pérez (born 4 November 1940) is a Spanish sports shooter. He competed at the 1980 Summer Olympics and the 1984 Summer Olympics.

References

1940 births
Living people
Spanish male sport shooters
Olympic shooters of Spain
Shooters at the 1980 Summer Olympics
Shooters at the 1984 Summer Olympics
Place of birth missing (living people)
20th-century Spanish people